Hemiphyllodactylus uga, also known as Uga's slender gecko, is a species of gecko. It is endemic to Myanmar.

References

Hemiphyllodactylus
Reptiles described in 2018
Endemic fauna of Myanmar
Reptiles of Myanmar